Siddharth University (SU), is a state university located at Kapilvastu, Siddharth Nagar, Uttar Pradesh, India. It was established on 17 June 2015 and affiliates colleges formerly affiliated to Deen Dayal Upadhyay Gorakhpur University and Dr. Ram Manohar Lohia Avadh University.

Affiliated colleges
The University has more than 250 colleges affiliated to it from six districts of UP, namely Maharajghanj, Siddharthnagar, Sant Kabir Nagar, Balrampur, Basti and Shravasti. These colleges were formerly affiliated with Deen Dayal Upadhyay Gorakhpur University and Dr. Ram Manohar Lohia Avadh University.

Academics
The Siddharth University offers undergraduate and postgraduate courses in the disciplines of humanities, sciences, commerce and management. Accordingly, it has four faculties.

Faculties
Faculty of Arts
Faculty of Science
Faculty of Commerce
Faculty of Home Science

References

External links
Official Website

Universities in Uttar Pradesh
Siddharthnagar district
Educational institutions established in 2015
2015 establishments in Uttar Pradesh